Grange Thistle is an Australian association football club based in Grange, Queensland. In 2021, the club fielded 11 senior teams and more than 85 junior teams. Both senior teams (men's and women's) currently compete in the Football Queensland Premier League 2.

Early years 
Grange Thistle is the last of three football clubs which have carried the Thistle name since the earliest days of organised football in Brisbane. However, the club's foundation secretary, R L (Bob) Waddell, pointed out in 1924 that "the present club was formed as recently as 1920"  (see accompanying article headed "A Thistle Record") and that apart from sharing a Scottish heritage it had no connection with the other two clubs (the original Thistle, formed in 1887, and Merthyr Thistle, which disbanded in 1920).Nearly four decades later Bob Waddell's son, Bill, also served Thistle as club president before  going on to become president of the Queensland Soccer Federation.

The first Thistle club was formed at a meeting held in the Criterion Hotel on 2 June 1887. At the time there were three Brisbane clubs believed to have Scottish connections, Queen's Park, St Andrews and Rangers, the latter club originally formed as the "Scottish Football Association" in 1883. According to Sam Ross, a member of the original Thistle club, it came into being as a breakaway group from Rangers.

The first Thistle club disappeared during the 1890s or early 1900s but a Scottish-linked successor emerged by 1911 under the name Merthyr Thistle, a club based at New Farm Park. Merthyr Thistle had a brief but successful career, winning the Brisbane first grade junior competition in 1915  before joining the senior ranks in 1919, the first season in which competitive football resumed in Brisbane after World War I.  In what turned out to be its only season in the senior ranks, the club reached the grand final, played at the Brisbane Cricket Ground on 4 October, but fell to a 3-1 defeat against Pineapple Rovers.

 
Two weeks later Merthyr Thistle rounded off the season on 18 October in the final game of its existence, a challenge match at Bulimba against Bush Rats, one of the leading clubs in the Ipswich competition, losing 1–0. At this stage there was as yet no public indication of the internal dissension which was to cause the collapse of Merthyr Thistle early in 1920 and the formation of the present club. So convivial was the atmosphere that the Ipswich Times report stated that “when the players were ready to return to the city they lined up and the Pipers’ Band led the way to the ferry. The visitors were later entertained at the Alexandria Café. Mr Morgan, on behalf of the Thistles, thanked the Rats for the visit and said he hoped that they would have more such matches in the future. Mr Joe Potts responded on behalf of the Rats, and commended the Thistles on the splendid way they had treated them”.

No further references to Merthyr Thistle have been traced until 9 February 1920, when indications of a crisis emerged in the form of an advertisement in the Daily Standard. Under the heading Merthyr Thistle Football Club, the advertisement called “all players and members” to a meeting just two days later on 11 February.

The sense of urgency was apparent when this advertisement was repeated in the same newspaper the next day. However, no report of the meeting, if it did take place, or further mention of Merthyr Thistle in  1920, has been found. It is probable that the formation of the present Thistle club took place at or after this meeting. Merthyr Thistle did re-emerge in the early 1920s at New Farm Park, the club's pre-1920 home ground, but only at junior level (where it competed against the new Thistle club's junior teams).

On 3 March 1920, six new clubs affiliated with the Queensland British Football Association at its adjourned annual general meeting. Merthyr Thistle was not represented. However, J Peebles, representing the newly formed Thistle club, was appointed as one of four club representatives on the executive committee.

Two weeks later, a press preview of the season listed nine clubs in the senior competition, including Thistle but not Merthyr Thistle. The inference is that the new club was formed at, or subsequent to, the meeting of Merthyr Thistle players and members called for 11 February 1920.

On 20 March 1920, the new Thistle club played its first match, a friendly against Brisbane City. In a 5-2 victory at Heath Park, W Nicholls had the honour of scoring the club's first goal, with Jock Cumberford and Bob Craig each netting a brace.

A few days later, the Queensland British Football Association placed its 30 registered junior clubs into three grades for the forthcoming season. Thistle's second-string team was placed in the second grade but Merthyr Thistle did not enter any teams in either the senior or junior grades.

On 27 March Thistle played a second friendly, against Queen's Park, also at Heath Park, where the new club had established its headquarters. The match was drawn 2–2.

On the official opening day of the 1920 season, 10 April, Thistle played the club's first competitive match, defeating Queen's Park 3–1 at the Brisbane Cricket Ground, with the following lineup: H May, W McBride, G Mackay, D Ross, J Peebles, J Lambert, J Cumberford, A McMillan, R Craig, A Thompson, W Nicholls. Centre-forward Craig scored a hat-trick. The highly successful first season ended with 10 wins, two draws and three defeats to place Thistle in second position behind Corinthians on the premiership table. Thistle's tenure at Heath Park was confirmed the following season when an application for use of the ground was approved by the Brisbane City Council, at an annual rent of one guinea.

By 1922 Thistle had amassed one of the most powerful teams in the country and were locked in a neck-and-neck premiership battle with Bundamba Rangers, both teams having won their first seven matches. However, Thistle eventually finished as runners-up to their Ipswich rivals, having paid a heavy price in mid-season while five players were away on representative duty (Jack Cumberford, Dave Cumberford and Billy McBride with Australia in New Zealand, along with Johnny Peebles and Jimmy Love on tour to New South Wales with Queensland).

But Thistle made no mistake just one season later, annexing their first major honour by claiming the 1923 Brisbane premiership with a 5–1 win in the Challenge Cup replay against Bundamba Rangers. Dinmore Bush Rats actually finished first on the points table, with Thistle second and Bundamba third, but under the short-lived Challenge Cup system featuring the top four teams in a knockout series, Thistle came out on top as the officially designated premiers.

In those first few seasons, Thistle's remarkable performances for a fledgling club marked it as one of Australia's most powerful squads. By the early 1930s, nine Thistle players had represented Australia, including the Cumberford brothers, Jack and Dave. Jack Cumberford, who coached the Queensland team after World War II, earned a unique honour when he was awarded a special medal for scoring Australia's first international goal in a 3–1 win against Wanganui in the opening game of the tour of New Zealand in 1922. Other Thistle players who earned selection for Australia during that period were Jimmy Love, Billy McBride, Angus Marshall, Andrew Park, John Peebles, Jimmy Robertson and John Steel. Peebles and Steel were both destined to make a long-term mark on Queensland football as senior administrators.

Press reports during the 1920s also provided confirmation that the Thistle club was not linked in any way with the now defunct Merthyr Thistle. A press profile of Thistle's international forward Jack Cumberford stated that he had played for Merthyr Thistle in 1919 but “the following season saw the club disband, and the present Thistle club formed”.

Two years later, as reported above, co-founder Bob Waddell confirmed in an article outlining Thistle's achievements that the club was founded in 1920 and listed its complete playing record, season by season. He also recalled that the first competitive match played by Thistle was against Queen's Park in 1920.

The following year, conclusive evidence was provided that no link existed between Merthyr Thistle and the club formed in 1920. Under the heading “The Story of the Thistle Club”, Bob Waddell stated the following: “In the 1919 season a club by the name of Merthyr Thistle was formed, but owing to great dissension among the officials and players, the club only reigned one season, and the players, with one exception, decided to break away the following year. A meeting was convened by J Cumberford, J Scott and R L Waddell, and it was decided unanimously that we form a Thistle club — an entirely new club having no connection whatever with the club known as Merthyr Thistle. J Lang (now a referee) was elected chairman, R L Waddell honorary secretary and J Scott honorary treasurer. The first season saw the club just failing to annex the honours both in the premiership and Charity Cup competitions.”

1930s 
By the late 1920s, Thistle's strength had waned and after finishing bottom of the first division premiership in 1929 the club was facing relegation. However, the following season saw one of the code's periodic upheavals in Queensland when Brisbane's leading clubs, with the sole exception of Thistle, decided to break away from the state governing body and form a company to run their affairs. Thistle declined to join the breakaway and at a special meeting held on 11 February 1930, it was decided to join the Ipswich and West Moreton Association instead.

At the start of the 1930 season Thistle moved to its current home Lanham Park which was described in April 1930 as "an open paddock".

By the end of the 1931 season, however, the club was struggling on and off the field, having finished last in the 10-team Ipswich competition and facing severe challenges during a period of world-wide recession.  In March, 1932 the Sports Referee reported that although members at the Thistle annual general meeting were determined to continue, the club was in deep financial difficulty, with a credit balance of £1/5 and liabilities of £4/10. Poor attendances at Lanham Park meant that only £8/16/4 had been collected during the entire preceding season and travel expenses for regular trips to Ipswich had also depleted the club's resources. It was decided to suspend operations because of the club's financial difficulties. President H M Herald indicated that the club intended to re-form if the dispute between the Ipswich and Brisbane organizations ended. However, this rift was not healed until several years later, by which time the Thistle club had effectively, if not officially, become defunct.

War Years 

No written record has been found to explain how or when the re-formed Thistle club re-emerged at Lanham Park. It is believed that two Scots, Neil Mackay and former Thistle and Queensland goalkeeper Jimmy Perotte, were instrumental in starting a junior team at Lanham Park between 1939 and 1942 (the latter year being listed as the club's foundation year in Queensland Soccer Football Association yearbooks from 1946 to 1961).

The fact that in 1932 the club clearly indicated an intention to re-form if circumstances changed, and that the name Thistle was retained, points strongly to its revival being regarded as a continuation of the club formed in 1920. One certainty, however, is that the club badge current in 2021, which displays 1919 as the foundation year, is inaccurate. This error apparently crept in at the time the Queensland Soccer Federation was formed in 1962, when this date first appeared in its yearbook. Every pre-1962 reference that has been found relating to the club's history lists the foundation year as 1920 or 1942.

However, there is one firm indication that the club was active again as early as the late 1930s. The Mackay family still has a blazer badge containing the inscription "Neil Mackay – Thistle president, 1939–1953)". The Queensland Soccer News reported on 21 May 1947 that Mackay had "re-formed the club with 11 juniors who had never played soccer before".

No formal fixtures could be played in the early 1940s because these had been suspended during World War Two. However, when competitions resumed in 1944, Thistle were able to field a team strong enough to win the junior division and earn promotion to the first division for the 1945 season.

Post-World War 2 
For the next 32 seasons, from 1945 to 1976, Thistle retained top division status in Brisbane without being able to add to their premiership honours. However, the club did have several major cup successes, including three consecutive Tristram Shield wins from 1950 to 1952 and a 6–1 thrashing of Azzurri (later Brisbane City) in the 1966 Ampol Cup final.

At the start of the 1961 season The Courier-Mail reported that Thistle had decided to enhance its local identity by adding Grange as a prefix to its name and (to avoid frequent clashes with other teams wearing colours similar to Thistle's traditional blue) would switch to tangerine and white as its primary colours. There was no change to playing personnel, home ground, club officials or top division status, except that long-serving Thistle stalwart Bob Jardine was elected as incoming president for the season ahead. There was no suggestion that a new club was being formed. For the second time in the club's history it was facing relegation after finishing bottom of the table in that season, but once again a split in Queensland football came to the rescue. Formation of the breakaway Queensland Soccer Federation at the start of the 1962 season enabled Thistle to join other leading Brisbane and Ipswich clubs in an eight-team semi-professional competition in which a respectable mid-table position was secured. This was largely due to the influence of diminutive Scottish captain-coach Norm Tran, whose acquisition from East Fife provided the impetus for a club revival. Tran represented Queensland several times that season before departing to join Sydney first division club Auburn.

But by 1976 club fortunes had again declined and Grange Thistle were relegated to the second division for the first time. Once again, a Scotsman was instrumental in enabling the club to bounce back immediately by winning promotion. This time the catalyst was the signing of Jim Hermiston, a member of the Aberdeen team which beat Celtic 3–1 to win the Scottish Cup in 1970.  Although Hermiston left after one season to play in the National Soccer League, Thistle enjoyed a period of great success in the short-lived Queensland State League (1979 to 1982), winning consecutive grand finals against Mount Gravatt in 1979 and 1980. During this period the club qualified for the national cup competition twice, losing each time to Brisbane Lions in the 1980 and 1981 NSL Cup competitions. The club also had cup success on the local scene, claiming the Ampol Cup for a second time in 1981.

Amid financial problems, the club controversially left the short-lived State League in 1982 and dropped back to Brisbane competition, winning its first Brisbane Division One premiership since 1923. There was, however, a big difference in the status of the two triumphs. In 1923 the local first division was an elite tier one competition but the 1982 version was ranked third in Queensland behind the National Soccer League and State League.

Grange Thistle competed in the Brisbane Premier League for all but three seasons from the commencement of this league in 1983 until 1996 when relegation heralded a period of decline in its playing fortunes. Since then it has played in  the second and third tiers of the Brisbane competition until achieving promotion back to the Premier League by finishing in second place in Capital League 1 in 2016.

21st century 
In 2018, Grange Thistle were crowned champions of the Brisbane Premier League after finishing second in the league and going on to win the finals series. They also won the Canale Cup for the first time since 1981, when it was known as the Ampol Cup, and retained this trophy in 2019.

In 2021, the club defeated Caboolture 3-1 in the grand final of the inaugural season of Football Queensland's Premier League 2 competition, having finished third on the premiership table.

Recent seasons

Men's senior team:

Source:

Women's senior team:

Source:

The tier is the level in the unofficial Australian soccer league system

Honours
Due to frequent restructures and re-classifications of divisions in Brisbane football, the club's first team honours below are listed by tier in the unofficial Brisbane football pyramid.

State Tier
Queensland State League – Premiers and Champions 1979
Queensland State League – Champions 1980

Brisbane – Tier 1
Brisbane Division 1 – Premiers 1923 (runners-up on Premiership points and winners of top-four Challenge Cup), 1982; Champions 1982
Tristram Shield – Winners 1950, 1951, 1952
Ampol Cup – Winners 1966, 1981
Pig N Whistle Canale Cup – Winners 2018, 2019

Brisbane – Tier 2
Brisbane Division 2 – Champions 1977
Capital League 1 – Champions 2016
Brisbane BPL – Champions 2018
South East Queensland  FQPL 2 – Champions 2021

Brisbane – Tier 3
Brisbane Premier Division 2 – Premiers 2007

References

External links
 Club Website

Soccer clubs in Brisbane
Brisbane Premier League teams
Association football clubs established in 1919
1919 establishments in Australia